The Southwestern Brittonic languages are the Brittonic Celtic languages spoken in what is now South West England and Brittany since the Early Middle Ages. During the period of their earliest attestation, the languages appear to be indistinguishable, but they gradually evolved into the Cornish and Breton languages. They evolved from the Common Brittonic formerly spoken across most of Britain and were thus related to the Welsh and Cumbric varieties spoken in Wales and the Hen Ogledd (the Old North, i.e. Northern England and the Scottish Lowlands), respectively.

The earliest stage of the languages, Primitive Cornish/Breton, is unattested. Written sources are extant from the Old Cornish/Breton period, roughly 800–1100, in which phase the languages are indistinguishable. As such, some linguists such as Peter Schrijver use the term Southwest British (i.e. Southwest Brittonic) to describe the language when "Old Cornish" and "Old Breton" were indistinguishable and only separated by geography rather than linguistically.

Description
Southwestern Brittonic is distinguished from Welsh by sound changes including:

Other significant differences are found in Welsh innovations in which Southwestern Brittonic did not participate, such as the development of the voiceless alveolar lateral fricative.

Footnotes

References

 
Languages attested from the 8th century
Brittonic languages
Armorica